Yelabuga (alternative spelling that reflects the Cyrillic spelling: Elabuga; ; , Alabuğa) is a town in the Republic of Tatarstan, Russia, located on the right bank of the Kama River and  east from Kazan. Population:

Geography

Climate

History
The former name of the city was Alabuga. Its history dates back to the 10th century, when a Volga Bulgar border castle, the so-called Alamir-Sultan castle was built by Bulgar Khan Ibrahim in 985 CE. The castle was built on the place of the legendary tomb of Alamir-Sultan (Alexander the Great "Macedonian"). The name 'Alabuga' originally referred to the tower of the castle, later the whole city was named Alabuga. The castle was later abandoned, and its remains are now known as Shaytan kalasy (Shaytan's castle). In the second half of the 16th century, a Russian village was founded on the same spot.

Administrative and municipal status
Within the framework of administrative divisions, Yelabuga serves as the administrative center of Yelabuzhsky District, even though it is not a part of it. As an administrative division, it is, together with the selo of Tarlovka, incorporated separately as the town of republic significance of Yelabuga—an administrative unit with the status equal to that of the districts. As a municipal division, the town of republic significance of Yelabuga is incorporated within Yelabuzhsky Municipal District as Yelabuga Urban Settlement.

Economy
Oil industry is present in the town. In the 1990s, a Ford assembly plant operated in the town. In 2008, Sollers JSC built a new factory to produce the Fiat Ducato, and from 2021, started to assemble a luxury vehicle called the Aurus Senat, for the Central Scientific Research Automobile and Automotive Engines Institute in Moscow (NAMI). There is also a factory for the production of household appliances: domestic oil electric heaters, electric meat grinders Italian group De'Longhi.

Public transportation needs are served by a bus and taxi networks. Plans for a trolleybus route are being discussed.

Notable people
The town is the birthplace of painter Ivan Shishkin. Nadezhda Durova, who, disguised as a man, was a highly decorated cavalry officer during the Napoleonic Wars died there in 1866.  It is also where the Russian poet Marina Tsvetayeva committed suicide in 1941. The poet is buried at the municipal cemetery.

Miscellaneous
Near Yelabuga is the Nizhnyaya Kama National Park.

International relations

Twin towns and sister cities
Yelabuga is twinned with:
 Safranbolu, Turkey
 Aleksin, Russia
 Beryozovsky, Russia
 Weilheim in Oberbayern, Germany

References

Notes

Sources

External links
Unofficial website of Yelabuga 
Unofficial website of Yelabuga 
Website about Yelabuga 
Article about Yelabuga, Nizhnekamsk and the surrounding area 
Population of Yelabuga by mother tongue in 1897 

Cities and towns in Tatarstan
Yelabuzhsky Uyezd
Populated places on the Kama River